The Turkish American Chamber of Commerce and Industry (TACCI) is a non-profit membership organization located in New York City. It was founded
in 2002.

Vision
TACCI's vision is establishing infrastructure and strategy necessary to increase and foster bilateral trade and investment opportunities between
U.S. and Turkey.

Mission
TACCI's mission is ensuring attainment of targeted trade and investment objectives between U.S. and Turkey and ensuring selection of qualified
Turkish industries / firms with potential to become global brands and
facilitating their global expansion efforts in the U.S..

Operations
TACCI's operations are made up of three core areas: membership, events, and business services. As a membership organization TACCI is based around its members. The member companies are both from both Turkey and the U.S. and represent large as well as small companies. TACCI regularly organizes a large selection of events. Events are mainly for the members, but are often open for anyone to join. They include seminars, luncheons, conferences, and galas. TACCI's consulting practice is known as Business Services.

Services
TACCI services include business development programs, industry and trend reports, export consulting and training, business relations and speaker engagements. Business Services also publishes Information on the web that covers fundamentals of transatlantic business.

See also
Chamber of commerce
Turkish American
United States Chamber of Commerce

External links
 http://www.turkishuschamber.com

Chambers of commerce in the United States
Middle Eastern-American culture in New York City
Turkish-American culture in New York (state)
Turkish organizations and associations in the United States
2002 establishments in New York City